Mikhail Bondarenko may refer to:

Mikhail Grigoryevich Bondarenko (1912–1943), Hero of the Soviet Union
Mikhail Ivanovich Bondarenko (1901–1943), Hero of the Soviet Union
Mikhail Zakharovich Bondarenko (1913–1947), twice Hero of the Soviet Union
Mykhailo Bondarenko (1905–1938), Soviet government and party functionary